Cotton is the nickname of:

 Cotton Davidson (1931-2022), American National Football League (NFL) quarterback for the Baltimore Colts
 Cotton Fitzsimmons (1931–2004), American college and NBA basketball coach
 Cotton Ivy (1930–2021), American humorist, comedian and entertainer who served in the Tennessee House of Representatives
 Cotton Knaupp (1889–1967), American Major League Baseball (MLB) shortstop
 Cotton Minahan (1882–1958), American MLB pitcher, and track and field athlete who competed at the 1900 Summer Olympics in Paris
 Cotton Nash (born 1942), American MLB outfielder and National Basketball Association (NBA) forward
 Cotton Owens (1924–2012), American NASCAR driver 
 Cotton Pippen (1911–1981), American MLB pitcher for the St. Louis Cardinals (1936), Philadelphia Athletics (1939), and Detroit Tigers (1939–40)
 Cotton Priddy (1928–1956), American NASCAR Grand National race car driver from Louisville, Kentucky
 Cotton Speyrer (born 1949), American NFL wide receiver for the Baltimore Colts and the Miami Dolphins
 Cotton Tierney (1894–1953), American MLB second baseman and third baseman for the Pittsburgh Pirates, Philadelphia Phillies, Boston Braves, and Brooklyn Robins
 Cotton Warburton (1911–1982), American film and television editor with sixty feature film credits with Metro-Goldwyn-Mayer Studios (MGM)

See also 

 
 
 Cotton (surname) people with surname

Lists of people by nickname